New Zion AME Zion Church is a historic African Methodist church at the junction of Myrtle and Neely Streets in Warren, Arkansas.  Built in 1927, it has a vernacular styling that includes Gothic and Romanesque Revival details, included castellated towers with parapet, and an arched entryway.  Its interior fixtures, including pews, chancel railing, and beadboard tray ceiling, are in original condition, but the windows have been modernized.

The church was listed on the National Register of Historic Places in 2000.

See also
National Register of Historic Places listings in Bradley County, Arkansas

References

Methodist churches in Arkansas
Churches on the National Register of Historic Places in Arkansas
Neoclassical architecture in Arkansas
Romanesque Revival church buildings in Arkansas
Churches completed in 1927
Churches in Bradley County, Arkansas
National Register of Historic Places in Bradley County, Arkansas
1927 establishments in Arkansas
African Methodist Episcopal Zion churches
African-American history of Arkansas
Warren, Arkansas
Neoclassical church buildings in the United States